Bajillion Dollar Propertie$ is an American comedy series on the Seeso comedy subscription streaming service. The series, created by Kulap Vilaysack, is a semi-scripted parody of the reality television franchise Million Dollar Listing. Bajillion Dollar Propertie$ previewed its pilot episode on February 20, 2016 and officially premiered on March 17, 2016, and the series' second season premiered in the fall of 2016. On December 12, 2016, Seeso renewed the series for a third and fourth season. On August 9, 2017, Seeso announced the shutdown of its service by the end of the year, leaving Bajillion Dollar Propertie$ without a home. On July 15, 2019, it was reported that the previously unaired fourth season would air on Pluto TV.

Cast and characters
 Dan Ahdoot as Amir Yaghoob
 Tim Baltz as Glenn Bouchard
 Ryan Gaul as Andrew Wright
 Mandell Maughan as Victoria King
Tawny Newsome as Chelsea Leight-Leigh
 Drew Tarver as Baxter Reynolds
 Paul F. Tompkins as Dean Rosedragon
 Eugene Cordero as DJ Rosedragon (season 4; recurring season 3)

Episodes

Season 1 (2016)

Season 2 (2016)

Season 3 (2017)

Season 4 (2019)

2017 campaign to save Bajillion Dollar Propertie$
On August 9, 2017 it was announced that NBC would be shutting down Seeso. A web campaign to "#BuyJillion" quickly formed to encourage another network or streaming service to pick up the show for future seasons. On July 15, 2019, it was reported that Pluto TV would air the previously unseen fourth season of Bajillion Dollar Propertie$.

References

External links
 

2010s American comedy television series
2016 American television series debuts
2019 American television series endings
English-language television shows
Improvisational television series
Seeso original programming
Television series by Paramount Television